John Waterbury Cudlip (ca 1815 – November 22, 1885) was a merchant and politician in New Brunswick. He represented St. John County in the Legislative Assembly of New Brunswick from 1857 to 1866 and from 1868 to 1870.

He was born in Saint John, New Brunswick, the son of John Cudlip and Rebecca Waterbury. He began work with John Robertson. He later formed a business involved in exporting and wholesale with George E. Snyder. Cudlip was also commander of a volunteer fire brigade. He was elected to the city council for Saint John in 1852. In the same year, he married Emily Allison. He ran unsuccessfully for a seat in the provincial assembly in 1854 and 1856. He served as vice-consul for Sweden and Norway from 1864 to 1876. He was named to the province's Executive Council in 1866 but defeated in the following general election. In 1837, he was named customs inspector for New Brunswick and Prince Edward Island and he served in that post until 1885. Cudlip died in Saint John from injuries sustained from a fire in his home.

References 
Biography at the Dictionary of Canadian Biography Online

1815 births
1885 deaths
Members of the Legislative Assembly of New Brunswick
Colony of New Brunswick people
Members of the Executive Council of New Brunswick